Harold L. Ickes Homes was a Chicago Housing Authority (CHA) public housing project on the Near South Side of Chicago, Illinois, United States. It was bordered between Cermak Road to the north, 24th Place to the south, State Street to the east, and Federal Street to the west, making it part of the State Street Corridor that included other CHA properties: Robert Taylor Homes, Dearborn Homes, Stateway Gardens and Hilliard Homes.

History
Named for a United States administrator and politician, Harold LeClair Ickes.
The housing project was constructed by the Public Works Administration between 1954 and 1955. It consisted of eleven 9-story high-rise buildings with a total of 738 apartments . In 2007, Ickes residents recorded acts of police harassment which included strip searches of African-American men as children watched; The footage aired on NBC's Channel 5. On October 9, 2007,  Rev. Jesse Jackson along with ministers from Chicago's west side and community members moved into the housing project to bring attention to the harassment situation.

Redevelopment
As of May 2015, most of the site remains undeveloped following its demolition as part of the Plan for Transformation/Plan Forward. In September 2013, two years after the final building was demolished, former residents called for the  housing authority to build replacement housing as promised. One former resident was quoted as saying: "We were told by the CHA that once the Ickes was torn down replacement units would then be built. That has not happened even though taxpayers' money is being used to help build a new Green Line station on Cermak Road and a new stadium for DePaul."

Education
Residents were zoned to schools in the Chicago Public Schools including John C. Haines School in Chinatown and Phillips Academy High School. Students from Ickes used a tunnel to get to Haines.

External links
Chicago Housing Authority: Harold Ickes Homes

References

Ickes
Ickes
Ickes
Ickes
Ickes
Ickes
Ickes
1955 establishments in Illinois
2011 disestablishments in Illinois